Justin Nicholas Jackson (born February 18, 1997) is a Canadian professional basketball player  who last played for the Long Island Nets of the NBA G League. He played college basketball for the Maryland Terrapins. He was selected in the second round of the 2018 NBA draft.

High school career
Born in Toronto, Ontario, Jackson attended Findlay Prep in Henderson, Nevada. In his junior year, he along with Allonzo Trier, played in the 2015 Dick's Sporting Goods High School National s at Christ the King Regional High School in Middle Village, Queens, New York. Findlay Prep entered the tournament as the #8 ranked team. On April 3, 2015, Findlay Prep would lose to Ben Simmons and #2 ranked Montverde Academy (57-53) in overtime in the semi-finals of the Tournament. On the season Jackson averaged 14.1 points, 7.1 rebounds per game, and 2.2 steals per game while leading the Pilots to a (29-2) overall record. During the spring and summer of 2015, Jackson competed on the Under Armour Association Circuit for the AAU team, Canada Elite. Jackson and current NBA player Thon Maker led Canada Elite to the Under Armour Association 17u championship game in Suwanee, Georgia. Canada Elite would lose to Team Charlotte (56-46) in the Championship game. Jackson participated in the NBPA Top 100 camp on June 22, 2015, at John Paul Jones Arena in Virginia. After his junior season concluded, Jackson transferred to Hill Academy in Vaughan, Ontario.  As a senior, he was named a First Team all-star of the Ontario Scholastic Basketball Association in 2016.

College career
Jackson was rated a four-star recruit and ranked as a consensus top-40 recruit in the Class of 2016 according to ESPN.  On May 27, 2016, Jackson committed to the University of Maryland. In his freshman season at Maryland he averaged, 10.5 points and 6.0 rebounds per game. After the season he declared for the 2017 NBA draft, but later withdrew his name.

On May 24, 2017, Jackson announced he will return to Maryland for his sophomore season. On December 28, 2017, it was announced that Jackson suffered a torn labrum in his right shoulder. He missed the remainder of the season. In just 11 games, Jackson averaged 9.8 points, 8.1 rebounds, and 1.9 assists per game. After the end of the season, Jackson would declare his permanent entry for the 2018 NBA draft on March 28, 2018.

Professional career

Lakeland Magic (2018–2021)
On June 21, 2018, Jackson was drafted by the Denver Nuggets with the 43rd overall pick in the 2018 NBA draft. He was subsequently traded to the Orlando Magic. On October 23, 2018, Jackson was included in the training camp roster of the Lakeland Magic. On January 9, 2019, the Lakeland Magic announced that Jackson had suffered from a season-ending injury.

On October 28, 2019, Jackson was included in the training camp roster of the Lakeland Magic. On November 5, 2019, Jackson was included in the opening night roster of the Lakeland Magic. He never suited up during the 2019–20 season due to the Achilles injury.

On April 22, 2020, Jackson signed with the Hamilton Honey Badgers, becoming the first NBA draftee to sign in the Canadian Elite Basketball League. Jackson was later included in the training camp roster for the Hamilton Honey Badgers, although he never played a game for the team.

On January 24, 2021, Jackson returned to the Lakeland Magic, where he would win the G League championship. In 11 games, he averaged 3.6 points, 2.0 rebounds and 0.7 steals on 11.5 minutes.

Long Island Nets (2021–2022) 
On April 6, 2021, Jackson signed with the Guelph Nighthawks of the Canadian Elite Basketball League.

On October 15, 2021, the Long Island Nets announced that they had acquired the returning right for Jackson from the Lakeland Magic in a five-team trade along with returning right of Devontae Cacok for the returning right for B.J. Johnson and a first-round draft pick in 2021 NBA G League draft. On October 25, 2021, Jackson was included in the training camp roster of the Long Island Nets. However, he was waived on January 18, 2022, after suffering a season-ending injury.

Career statistics

NBA G League

Regular season

|-
| style="text-align:left;"| 2018–19
| style="text-align:left;"| Lakeland
| 10 || 4 || 17.4 || .347 || .207 || .714 || 3.7 || .9 || .5 || .5 || 4.5
|- class="sortbottom"
| style="text-align:center;" colspan="2"| Career
| 10 || 4 || 17.4 || .347 || .207 || .714 || 3.7 || .9 || .5 || .5 || 4.5

College

|-
| style="text-align:left;"| 2016–17
| style="text-align:left;"| Maryland
| 33 || 30 || 27.8 || .438 || .438 || .698 || 6.0 || .9 || .9 || .8 || 10.5
|-
| style="text-align:left;"| 2017–18
| style="text-align:left;"| Maryland
| 11 || 10 || 29.4 || .366 || .250 || .828 || 8.1 || 1.9 || .8 || .8 || 9.8
|- class="sortbottom"
| style="text-align:center;" colspan="2"| Career
| 44 || 40 || 28.2 || .418 || .386 || .728 || 6.5 || 1.2 || .9 || .8 || 10.3

References

External links
Maryland Terrapins bio

1997 births
Living people
Basketball players from Toronto
Black Canadian basketball players
Canadian expatriate basketball people in the United States
Canadian men's basketball players
Denver Nuggets draft picks
Findlay Prep alumni
Lakeland Magic players
Long Island Nets players
Maryland Terrapins men's basketball players
Power forwards (basketball)
Small forwards
Guelph Nighthawks players